Jennifer Lee, known professionally as Tokimonsta (stylized as TOKiMONSTA), is an American record producer and DJ based in Los Angeles. She has collaborated with artists such as Anderson .Paak, Earthgang, Isaiah Rashad, Selah Sue, and ZHU. Additionally, has done a number of official remixes, a few being Beck, Duran Duran, Olafur Arnalds, Disclosure, Sia, the Netflix show  Squid Game and Odesza. In 2019, she was nominated for “Best Dance / Electronic Album” at the Grammy Awards for her album Lune Rouge.

Early life 
TOKiMONSTA grew up in Torrance, California. Her parents immigrated to the US from South Korea; thus, she is second generation Korean American.  She was raised by her mother who ran a small business to support their family.  As a young child, her mother tasked her with classical piano lessons. Lee often notes disliking the lessons as a child, though she appreciates the structural foundation it created for her approach to composing and producing.

She graduated from University of California, Irvine. There she first began producing music, using the Fruity Loops Studio digital audio workstation (DAW). She later progressed to producing using the Ableton Suite as her primary DAW. She participated in beat cyphers and battles at Leimert Park's Project Blowed and Low End Theory. Upon graduating, she worked for a video game publisher while continuing to make music and perform as a hobby.  She would later be laid off, due the US economic recession, and decide to pursue music full time.

Career
Lee was invited to attend the Red Bull Music Academy in London in 2010. She was the first woman to sign to Flying Lotus's Brainfeeder label and released her first album, Midnight Menu, in November 2010 on Brainfeeder. She was rated the number one Hottest Los Angeles Lady DJ by LA Weekly in December 2010. She released the EP Creature Dreams, also on Brainfeeder, in 2011. The next year, she released Boom, an 11-track collaborative project with Suzi Analogue as Analogue Monsta.

In 2013, her second album, Half Shadows, was released on Ultra Records. In 2014, she released Desiderium on her own Young Art Records. She returned to the Red Bull Music Academy that same year as an alumni lecturer. She produced Gavin Turek's You're Invited in 2015 on Young Art Records. On September 9, 2015, she announced on Twitter the release of her solo album Fovere and she will be out on tour in support of her new album starting November 9, 2015.

She is profiled in the 2020 documentary film Underplayed.

In December 2022, Lee performed at the inaugural LA3C festival at the Hot Import Nights stage alongside EDM artists Freya Fox, DJ Peach, Meirlin, DJ Accia, Lucid Lolo, DJ Rose Gold, and many others.

Name
The name Tokimonsta originates from the Korean word for rabbit (tokki), which she took from a Korean's children's song, "San Toki".

Personal life 
Lee was diagnosed with Moyamoya disease in late 2015. After undergoing two brain surgeries, she briefly lost language and comprehension skills. Once these were regained, Lee eventually began work on her 2017 album Lune Rouge, despite not being able to fully understand music. She has noted that this album was her most personal piece of work due to the difficulties she experienced prior to making it.

She discusses surmounting these challenges in Vox's Netflix series, Explained (season 1, episode 20) and the Great Big Story miniseries Soundwave.

Discography

Albums
 Midnight Menu (2010)
 Half Shadows (2013)
 Desiderium (2014)
 Fovere (2016)
 Lune Rouge (2017)
 Oasis Nocturno (2020)

Extended plays
 Bedtime Lullabies (2008)
 Cosmic Intoxication (2010)
 Creature Dreams (2011)
 Los Angeles 8/10 (2011) (with Mike Gao)
 Boom (2012) (with Suzi Analogue, as Analogue Monsta)
 You're Invited (2015) (with Gavin Turek)
 Come And Go Remixed (2020)
 Get Me Some Remixed (2020)

Singles
 "USD / Free Dem" (2010) (with Blue Daisy)
 "Mileena's Theme" (2011) (for Mortal Kombat)
 "Darkest (Dim)" (2012) (with Gavin Turek)
 "Go With It" (2013) (with MNDR)
 "The Force" (2013) (with Kool Keith)
 "The World Is Ours" (2014)
 "Realla" (2014) (with Anderson Paak)
 "Steal My Attention" (2014)
 "Drive" (2014) (with Arama)
 "Pinching" (2014) (with Iza Lach)
 "Saw Sydney (Pharrell 'That Girl' Flip)" (2015)
 "Hemisphere" (2015) (with Gavin Turek)
 "Surrender" (2015) (with Gavin Turek)
 "Put It Down" (2015) (with Anderson .Paak)
 "Don't Call Me" (2017) (feat. Yuna)
 "We Love" (2017) (featuring MNDR)
 "I Wish I Could" (2018) (featuring Selah Sue)
 "Strange Foot" (2019) (featuring Ambré)
 "Dream Chorus" (2019)
 "Love That Never" (2019)
 "Fried For the Night" (2020) (featuring EarthGang)
 "One Day" (2020) (featuring Bibi and Jean Deaux)

Remixes
 Shlohmo - "Hot Boxing the Cockpit" (2010)
 Suzi Analogue - "NXT MSG" (2010)
 Eight and a Half - "Scissors" (2011)
 Take - "Horizontal Figuration" (2011)
 Andreya Triana - "Far Closer" (2011)
 Swede:Art - "I'm a R.O.B.O.T." (2011)
 Daedelus - "Tailor-Made" (2011)
 Kidkanevil - "Megajoy" (2011)
 Hundred Waters - "Thistle" (2012)
 Jodeci - "Freek'n You" (2012)
 Stan Getz & João Gilberto - "Corcovado" (2013)
 Felix Cartal - "New Scene" (2013)
 Justin Timberlake - "Suit & Tie" (2013)
 Tinashe - "2 On" (2014)
 Elizabeth Rose - "Sensibility" (2014)
 Kilo Kish - "IOU" (2014)
 Jessie Ware - "Keep On Lying" (2014)
 Mariah Carey - "Heartbreaker" (2014) (with Io Echo)
 Lupe Fiasco - "Superstar" (2014)
 Yacht - "Where Does This Disco?" (2015)
 The Drums - "There's Nothing Left" (2015)
 Gavin Turek - "Frontline" (2015)
 Lil Uzi Vert - "Team Rocket" (2016)
 Beck - "Wow" (2016)
 Maroon 5 & Cardi B – "Girls Like You" (2018) 
 George FitzGerald and Lil Silva - "Rollback" (2018)
Odesza - "Falls" (2018)
Olafur Arnalds - "They Sink" (2019)

References

External links
 

21st-century American musicians
21st-century American women musicians
Ableton Live users
American electronic musicians
American hip hop DJs
American hip hop record producers
American musicians of Korean descent
Club DJs
Women DJs
Living people
Musicians from Los Angeles
Musicians from Torrance, California
Remixers
Ultra Records artists
University of California, Irvine alumni
American women in electronic music
Record producers from California
American women record producers
Project Blowed
American women hip hop musicians
American women DJs
Year of birth missing (living people)